Varvasaina is a village and a community in the eastern part of the municipality of Pyrgos, Elis, Greece. The community consists of the villages Varvasaina and Kato Varvasaina. It is situated in a valley between low hills, 3 km southeast of Koliri, 3 km northwest of Salmoni, 5 km north of Epitalio and 5 km east of Pyrgos town centre. The Greek National Road 74 (Pyrgos - Olympia - Tripoli) passes south of the village. The railway from Pyrgos to Kalamata and Olympia passes through Kato Varvasaina.

Historical population

See also
List of settlements in Elis

References

Populated places in Elis